Francisco Stromp was an association football player and coach, founding member and Club official of the Sporting Clube de Portugal.

History

Francisco Stromp was born on May 21, 1892, in Largo do Intendente in Lisbon, and was the first great symbol of Sporting.

At the age of three, Francisco fell ill and his father's friends and family doctors advised his family to leave Lisbon because the boy needed free air. They moved to Lumiar, which was out of town at the time. It was there that he met José Alvalade with whom he founded Sporting Clube de Portugal in 1906, being one of the dissidents of the Campo Grande Football Club.

In 1908, Francisco Stromp was 16 years old when he made his debut with Sporting Clube de Portugal in 1923/24. Throughout his career he has played more than one hundred games in the honor category, and captained the team for several years, during which he was four times Lisbon Champion and Portuguese Champion in the 1922/23 season, in this case also as coach, this later of Augusto Sabbo to have resigned and of the Technical Council to have given to the captains of the 1ª and 2ª categories the responsibility of guiding the training of the teams of Sporting.

Before, at a time when the figure of the coach did not yet exist, it was the captain who guided the team and made the necessary decisions on the field. It can be said that Francisco Stromp was the first champion manager in Sporting, being responsible for the first Lisbon Championship conquered in the 1914/15 season.

Within the field he occupied the positions of mid-right and advanced-center, standing out for his delivery having represented the several Lisbon Selections of that time, including the first to play abroad, that on August 27, 1910, won in Spain to Huelva by 4–0, with 2 goals of his own, and that went to Brazil in 1913.

Although not an eclectic athlete like his brother António, he was champion in the discus throw and in the 3x100m relay, also practicing tennis, cricket and rugby.

He was also a football referee, at a time when it was the players who played those roles.

Francisco Stromp lived almost exclusively for Sporting, neither girlfriends, nor politics, nor studies, nor anything, the club was his great and only passion, to the point of crying in the prelections, or in the interval of the games, when he addressed his colleagues Of team, appealing to his "sportinguismo" to arrive at the victories. Besides, he was a gentleman, being respected and admired by opponents and rivals.

He also held various positions as a club officer, beginning with the General Assembly Board presided over by the Viscount of Alvalade. Later he was part of the Queirós dos Santos and Soares Júnior Directorates in Management in 1918, and became the Vice President of the Board between February 19, 1925 and February 23, 1926.

He was also part of the first and third Administrative Commission of Sporting Clube de Portugal, assuming his responsibilities in the difficult moments of the Club's life, and ended his participation in the leadership, as a Member of the Board chaired by Sanches Navarro in the Management of 1927 .

On July 1, 1930 he died of his own will, in the agony of a serious illness, choosing the day in which Sporting celebrated his 24th birthday, and remained perpetually as the club member nº. 3, the number he had at the time.

On December 18, 1962, a group of distinguished sportinguists decided to establish themselves to promote initiatives that, within the "leonine spirit", would serve to enhance and enhance Sporting. Francisco Silva, one of the promoters of the movement, suggested to the unanimous acceptance that the name of Francisco Stromp should serve as patron to the group.

This was how the Stromp Group was born, considered the "moral reserve of Sporting", whose most significant of initiatives is the annual award of the Stromp Awards, which aim to distinguish all those who stand out the most every year, in the service of the Club in its various areas.

On October 26, 1990 he was awarded, posthumously, the Sports Merit Medal.

The Lisbon City Council attributed its name to a street in the area of Estádio José Alvalade, where a bust evocative of this eternal symbol of Sporting Clube de Portugal was placed.

Honours

Player
Sporting CP
 Campeonato de Portugal: 1922–23
 Lisbon Championship: 1914–15, 1918–19, 1921–22, 1922–23

Manager
Sporting CP
 Lisbon Championship: 8

References

External links
 Um ‘Leão’ Multifacetado

Sporting CP
Sporting CP managers
Sporting CP footballers
1892 births
1930 deaths
Association footballers not categorized by position
Portuguese footballers
Portuguese football managers
Portuguese people of German descent
Footballers from Lisbon